Fortenova Group is a food producer and retailer based in Zagreb. It has been operating since 1 April 2019. The company was established through the implementation of the Settlement Plan closed between the creditors of Agrokor which had, due to illiquidity and over-indebtedness, ended up in pre-bankruptcy, managed through the Extraordinary Administration Procedure pursuant to the Act on Extraordinary Administration Procedures in Companies of Systemic Importance for the Republic of Croatia.

As a result of the successfully conducted and concluded negotiations among Agrokor's creditors and the adopted final and non-appealable Settlement Plan, Fortenova Group started its operations as a new company with a completely redesigned ownership, organisational and management structure.

The team, headed by Extraordinary Commissioner Fabris Peruško, that ran the process of Agrokor's financial restructuring over the course of the Extraordinary Administration Procedure, was presented with the prestigious TMA Turnaround and Transaction Award for 2019 in the category of international transaction of the year. Namely, the process that resulted in the settlement among creditors and its successful implementation was assessed by the international financial industry as the most significant procedure of its kind in the world that year.

In less than a year after the implementation of the settlement plan, Fortenova Group successfully completed its refinancing by issuing a four-year bond, it has been implementing transformational processes, increasing its operating profits, has significantly improved its cash position and become a financially entirely stable company. The company is managed by a board of directors and a team of Executive Directors headed by Fabris Peruško as chief executive officer.

Fortenova Group employs more than 50,000 workers in more than 30 administrative headquarters, 29 production plants, more than 2,500 sales locations and distribution centers across six jurisdictions and directly participates with its own business operations in food production, retail chain management and agriculture on the markets of Croatia, Slovenia, Bosnia and Herzegovina, Serbia and Montenegro. Through its affiliated companies Fortenova Group also owns a company in Hungary. Through the export of its food products Fortenova Group is present on the markets of more than 20 countries of the world, where the most significant outbound markets are the states of the region and the European Union. At the same time, in the SEE region it has a retail network featuring more than 2,500 retail stores.
The key sectors in which Fortenova Group generates significant impacts on the market are the retail sector, the beverage production sector, the edible oil production sector, the fresh and processed meat production sector, the milk and dairy production sector, as well as the agricultural sectors of crop husbandry, livestock breeding, viticulture and wine production, olive growing and fruit and vegetable growing. Given the diverse nature of its operations, Fortenova Group places over 4,000 products and provides a large number of services on all the markets where it operates.

The company has a strong strategic orientation towards working together with local suppliers, maintaining and developing shorter supply chains, developing regional agricultural and food production of local origin on all markets where it operates, investing in knowledge and innovation and increasing the competitiveness of the overall economic environment.

History
To prevent the collapse of the Agrokor system due to illiquidity and over-indebtedness as well as the consequences on the economies of Croatia and other countries in Southeast Europe, on 10 April 2017, the Extraordinary Administration Procedure was activated pursuant to the Act on Extraordinary Administration Procedures in Companies of Systemic Importance for the Republic of Croatia.

The Commercial Court of Zagreb sanctioned the creditors’ Settlement Plan on 6 July 2018, and by the decision of the High Commercial Court passed on 18 October 2018, the creditors’ Settlement Plan has become final.

The Extraordinary Administration Procedure has been accepted as an insolvency procedure in England and Wales by the High Court of England and Wales on 9 November 2017, for the territory of Switzerland in February 2018 and in the US at the Bankruptcy Court New York according to Chapter 15 in November 2018. By Regulation of the European Parliament and the Council, in July 2018 the Act on Extraordinary Administration Procedures was included in the list of national laws recognized as insolvency procedures on the entire territory of the European Union.

Fortenova Group commenced operations on 1 April 2019, taking over assets of indebted conglomerate Agrokor. At the time of establishment, it had a total of 159 subsidiary companies in which 52,000 people are employed.

In September 2019, Fortenova Group issued 1.16 billion euros in four-year bonds to refinance a 2017 loan. The new financing is structured as a EUR 1.2bn four-year bond. This transaction and the financial restructuring of Agrokor during the course of the Extraordinary Administration Procedure, resulting in a settlement between the creditors and its successful implementation, was assessed in the USA as the most significant international company transaction of its kind worldwide. The team in charge of the process headed by the Extraordinary Commissioner Fabris Peruško won the prestigious 2019 TMA Turnaround and Transaction Award in the category International Company Transaction of the Year.
According to the choice made by readers of Večernji list, the refinancing of the roll-up loan at Fortenova Group was the commercial event of the year 2019 in Croatia. Thus Fabris Peruško, Chief Executive Officer of Fortenova Group, received the award presented since four years for the second time in a row and on that occasion he pointed out that the nomination itself was a great honour for the company, while the acknowledgment has confirmed the importance that the refinancing had for the business operations of Fortenova Group as one of the region's most important companies as well as the indirect impact this had on the economies of all countries in which Fortenova Group operates.

Over four years of its operations Fortenova Group has become a financially healthy company that has cut its leverage in half compared to the period when it was founded. The debt-to-adjusted-EBITDA ratio was thus reduced from 7.2 to 3.6 times in late 2022, amounting to only 10 percent of the leverage of the old Agrokor. At the same time, in the period from 2017 to 2022 the company tripled its operating profits from EUR 122 million to over EUR 300 million, while its revenue reached the amount of EUR 5 billion. 
In late 2020 it has also realized its first acquisition of the Osijek-based dairy plant assets, where it commenced dairy production under the Kravica Kraljica brand on 1 January 2021.

With the transfer of 69.57 per cent of shares of Poslovni sistem Mercator from Agrokor d.d. to Fortenova Group, on 23 April 2021, Mercator became an integral part of Fortenova Group's Retail Division, with Fortenova Group now holding 88.1 per cent of Mercator. The Mercator share transfer took place in parallel to the refinancing of Mercator's debt with 55 banks in the total amount of EUR 385m. In cooperation with HPS Partners and VTB Fortenova Group secured the required funds and entirely replaced Mercator's debt, thus securing a smooth transfer of the ownership of Mercator from a bankrupt company to a stable company with a consolidated ownership and creditor structure. Prior to that Fortenova Group met a number of formal prerequisites for the realization of the Mercator transfer – among other things, it obtained all the required regulatory approvals.

Fortenova Group's retail network has thus grown to include two and a half thousand Mercator and Konzum points of sale with a total of 39 thousand employees working on five markets across the region with a population of almost 20 million.

Fortenova Group has completed in September 2021 the sale of its Frozen Food Business Group (FFBG) consisting of Ledo plus d.o.o., Ledo Čitluk d.o.o. and Frikom d.o.o. alongside several smaller affiliated companies to Nomad Foods Limited. The value of the transaction is EUR 615 million.

In October 2021, Fortenova Group, comprising some of the most significant companies in Croatia and the region, such as Konzum, Mercator, Jamnica, Zvijezda, Dijamant, Belje, Tisak, Sarajevski kiseljak etc., has formally joined the UN Global Compact, the world's largest sustainable development and corporate sustainability initiative. Through operating strategies in all of its core businesses Fortenova Group has opted for sustainable development and efficient management in the long term, thus also driving a stronger involvement of the business sector in activities intended to progress towards sustainable development goals and achieving corporate sustainability in accordance with the principles of the UN Global Compact.

Mercator
April 2019 – on 1 April 2019, Mercator was not transferred to Fortenova Group

September 2019 – Javna agencija agencija za varstvo konkurence / Public Competition Agency (of Slovenia) (AVK) passed a non-final ruling in September 2019, unprecedented in the history of that Agency, imposing a fine of EUR 53.9m due to failure to file the concentration of the company Costella, acquired by Ivica Todorić, i.e. Agrokor AG from Switzerland, back in 2016. Agrokor lodged an appeal against this decision.

December 2019 – On 16 December AVK passes the decision to temporarily seize Mercator d.d. shares from Agrokor d.d., allegedly to secure funds for the collection of the fine. The interim measure of seizing the shares of Mercator d.d. was passed pursuant to the Misdemeanour Act, specifically the provisions of that Act that otherwise apply in case of traffic offences or similar offences discovered in flagranti, committed by foreign natural persons in the Republic of Slovenia. This in fact constituted an expropriation of private property of Agrokor d.d., whereby the Mercator shares were temporarily seized without any court decision and with no valid legal justification.

June 2020 – With its judgment dated 1 June 2020, the court Okrajno sodišče of Ljubljana altered the decision of the Competition Agency of the Republic of Slovenia on the amount of the fine imposed on Agrokor for not having filed the acquisition of the company Costella with the Agency for assessment at a time when Ivica Todorić managed the company and was its owner. 
The monetary fine in the amount of EUR 53.9m was reduced by the Court to one million euros, with the explanation that the failure to file the concentration was not the result of the "intention to bypass the filing of the concentration in order to possibly cause harmful effects on market competition", but was rather the "result of unconscientious negligence of the responsible person Ivica Todorić". The Court has therefore assessed that a monetary fine of one million euros was the "appropriate and equitable sanction for the offence in question".

July 2020 – The Supreme Court of the Republic of Slovenia passes a judgement pursuant whereto the Mercator shares temporarily seized in late 2019 by decision of the Public Competition Agency of the Republic of Slovenia, have to be returned to Agrokor without delay. The Supreme Court declared the seizure of shares to be unlawful, arguing that AVK had no legal foundation to issue the ruling on seizing the shares.

The request for the protection of lawfulness was filed with the Supreme Court of the Republic of Slovenia by the State Attorney's Office of the Republic of Slovenia, where it basically stated that the Slovenian AVK had acted unlawfully by seizing the Mercator shares from Agrokor. With its final and non-appealable judgement the Supreme Court confirmed that statement, changed AVK's decision and stopped the procedure run by AVK against Agrokor, in which the Mercator shares had been seized. Thus the Supreme Court enabled Agrokor to freely dispose of the shares.

September 2020 – The European Commission cleared the concentration of Fortenova Group and Mercator, thus paving the way for the transfer of Mercator to Fortenova Group.

April 2021 – With the transfer of 69.57 per cent of shares of Poslovni sistem Mercator from Agrokor d.d. to Fortenova Group, on 23 April 2021, Mercator became an integral part of Fortenova Group's Retail Division, with Fortenova Group now holding 88.1 per cent of Mercator.

April 2022 - Fortenova Group becomes the sole owner of Mercator

Operational transformation in the period 2018 – 2022
Fortenova Group’s operational transformation over the course of four years (2018 – 2022) is characterized by three parallel processes – credit, ownership and debt consolidation. 

Credit consolidation:

In Fortenova Group’s credit consolidation process the total number of creditors was reduced from the total around 70 of Agrokor’s creditors and 55 banks crediting Mercator to two key creditors headed by the US investor HPS Investment Partners. 
Until 2022 the financing and refinancing took place in two stages – (the first being) the refinancing of the so-called SPFA loan by a bond issued in 2019 with a maturity of four years. The importance of closing that arrangement lies in the fact that entirely new investors from the international market, that had not taken part in financing the Extraordinary Administration, recognized Fortenova Group’s potential and the company has been provided with medium-term stability as well as with the prerequisites for its long-term sustainability, growth and development. 
In 2021 Fortenova Group was able to secure the required funds with the same partners and entirely refinance Mercator’s EUR 385 million debt, while another refinancing would follow in the third stage of the credit consolidation in 2022. 

Debt consolidation

The leverage reduction was achieved thanks to the divestment of most of the company’s non-core assets as well as some properties that were not used in the core business. At the same time and at the right moment the Frozen Food Business Group (Ledo and Frikom) was sold at the price of as much as EUR 615 million to the best possible investor that provided the business with prospects for further development.  In addition, due to profitability improvement measures and while retaining full employment, Fortenova Group’s operating profits grew in the period from 2017 to 2022 by around EUR 200 million. 

Ownership consolidation:

In the ownership segment the Group was faced with several challenges at its establishment: the structure that arose from the settlement among Agrokor’s creditors was characterized by “fragmented” ownership – a large number of co-owners with very small shares, the non-consolidated structure of Mercator and the co-ownership by Russian banks. 

Over the course of four years the challenges with regards to ownership were dealt with in parallel. In 2021 Mercator was consolidated and Fortenova Group acquired 100 percent of its ownership. In addition, the number of around 200 owners that had held 66 percent of the Group was brought down to three owners holding around 80 percent of the company. Thanks to a group of local investors from Croatia, around 30 percent of Fortenova Group’s ownership is consolidated within Open Pass. 

Co-ownership by Russian banks
During the process of Agrokor’s restructuring, the debt towards financial institutions that had provided credits to Agrokor until 2017 was swapped into ownership shares. The debt towards Sberbank amounted to EUR 1.1bn and hence, pursuant to the Settlement Plan, Sberbank became the largest single owner of Fortenova Group with a share of 42.5 percent, and another Russian state-owned bank – VTB – also entered the ownership structure. 
At the time of Fortenova Group’s establishment the Russian banks that were its co-owners already were under sectoral sanctions, which were significantly extended following the beginning of the war in Ukraine in 2022. They were therefore not able to exercise their ownership rights in Fortenova Group, including voting at the Shareholders’ Meetings, as the rights arising from their co-ownership were suspended, i.e. their voting rights were frozen. 

Sberbank’s accelerated exit from ownership 

On the one hand, this situation has accelerated Sberbank’s exit from Fortenova Group’s ownership structure, but on the other it slowed down the company’s operations over the course of 2022, particularly in terms of having to argue that the sanctioned banks did not hold the majority ownership nor control over the company and that Fortenova Group itself has never been, nor has there been any reason for it to be, under sanctions. 
Intensive discussions with potential investors interested in acquiring the share from SBK Art, the company through which Sberbank holds its 42.5 percent stake in Fortenova Group, were the most advanced with the Croatian pension funds.  However, in spite of the fact that the company team together with its legal advisors had devised a complex mechanism that would allow for the transaction to be completed within record time, while entirely complying with the laws and sanctions, the pension funds failed to use the opportunity and prove themselves as serious investors by what would have been not only an investment in the largest company in this part of Europe, but also a contribution to the additional stability of regional production and food supply.  

Placing of SBK ART on sanctions list

Given that this transaction was not realized within the deadline set by the sanction measures, Sberbank unilaterally undertook a purported divestment of its ownership share, without the knowledge of the company and other co-owners. 
The purported acquisition of the company SBK ART, however, proved to be – and Croatia submitted evidence to corroborate that – an attempt to breach the sanctions regime in force in the European Union and the UK. According to the evidence, behind this transaction there were Croatian citizens with a widely spread business network in Russia, who realized a fictitious transaction  for which no money whatsoever has been transferred from the United Arab Emirates.  
Hence with its Regulation No. 2022/2475 of 16th December 2022, that forms part of the ninth package of sanctions for legal persons and individuals related to Russia and the Russian aggression on Ukraine, the EU Council has upon proposal of the Republic of Croatia included the company SBK ART, through which Sberbank of Russia holds 42.5 percent ownership shares in Fortenova Group, on the sanctions list. 
With the acceptance of evidence that “Sberbank has retained effective control over SBK ART notwithstanding the purported transfer of its shares to a businessman in the United Arab Emirates” and with SBK ART now included on the sanctions list, everything related to that company is subject to the Council Regulation concerning restrictive measures in respect of actions undermining or threatening the territorial integrity, sovereignty and independence of Ukraine, and any breach of those sanctions entails criminal liability for any citizens of EU member states and the UK who may have taken part in it. 

Judicial conformation of SBK Art’s sanctions status

In the meantime the inability of SBK Art to exercise their ownership rights was confirmed by all judicial instances in the Netherlands, whereby the sanctioned part of the ownership in SBK Art has been finally and completely separated from the other co-owners and the sanctioned persons have been prevented from having any influence on the governance and decision-making of Fortenova Group.
In particular, the Court of Appeals in Amsterdam passed a judgment in December 2022 according to which SBK Art as a sanctioned company had no voting rights whatsoever at the Shareholders’ Meetings of Fortenova Group STAK Stichting and was not allowed to participate in the Shareholders’, i.e. the Depositary Receipt Holders’ Meetings of Fortenova Group.  
The judgment is based on the construction of the way the sanctions adopted by the European Commission in November 2022 work, according to which the voting rights of sanctioned shareholders are explicitly considered to be an intangible economic resource and have to be frozen, i.e. their exercise has to be prevented.  The Dutch Court of Appeal fully applied the European Commission’s instruction from November, according to which the shareholders of sanctioned companies cannot exercise their direct or indirect voting rights under any circumstances nor for any purpose, i.e. their voting right has to be entirely frozen. 
The judgment of another Dutch court from September 2022, whereby SBK Art was allowed to partly exercise their voting rights on some topics after the company SBK Art had lodged an appeal with the Dutch court that they were not allowed to participate in shareholders’ meetings and exercise their voting rights, has thus been dismissed. 
This current judgment has dismissed all requests of SBK Art and confirmed beyond doubt that the sanction rules prevented the representatives of SBK Art from being accepted at shareholders’ meetings and voting at those meetings. SBK Art was also ordered to pay all court expenses regarding both the dismissed and the lateset judgment of the Dutch courts. 
This decision was also confirmed in January 2023 by the Commercial Department of the Court of Appeal of Amsterdam, the Netherlands, which also confirmed all decisions made at the Depositary Receipt Holders’ Meeting of Fortenova Group, held as well in January 2023 in the Netherlands. 

Depositary Receipt Holders’ Meeting – January 2023 

The owners supported all proposed decisions, which were adopted by a majority of more than 77 percent of votes present. 
Namely, two previous shareholders’ meetings where the same decisions had been proposed for voting lacked the required majority, as the sanctioned shareholder SBK Art was not able to attend the voting. Therefore a third shareholders’ meeting was held with the same agenda where, pursuant to the Articles of Association, the support of 75 percent of all present shareholders was required to adopt the decisions. 
Shareholders with voting rights adopted a number of decisions that will, to the benefit of the company and all non-sanctioned shareholders, facilitate the decision-making at future shareholders’ meetings, enable the further consolidation of Fortenova Group’s structure and operations and provide for the timely adoption of key business decisions. The decisions of the Shareholders’ Meeting shall make it possible to proceed with new acquisitions and mergers or asset disposals up to the maximum amount of EUR 500 million in 2023, subject to the prior decision of Fortenova Group’s Board of Directors. The prerequisites have also been created for the refinancing of Fortenova Group’s existing debt and addressing various financial liabilities, also subject to the prior approval of the Board of Directors. 
The shareholders have also voted in favour of extending the term of Fortenova Group’s Board of Directors for another six years and appointed Fabris Peruško, Pavo Vujnovac, Damir Spudić, Maksim Poletaev and Vsevolod Rozanov for the next six years, thus securing the functioning of the BoD in the forthcoming period.

List of larger companies in Fortenova Group
Retail:

Konzum
Poslovni sistemi Mercator
Tisak

Food:

Jamnica
Sarajevski kiseljak
PIK Vrbovec
Zvijezda
Dijamant
Roto dinamic
MG Mivela

Agriculture:

Agrolaguna
Belje
PIK Vinkovci
Vupik

References

External links
 

Conglomerate companies established in 2019
Food and drink companies of Croatia
2019 establishments in Croatia
Holding companies of Croatia
Companies based in Zagreb
Croatian brands
Agrokor